MPU may refer to:

Science and technology
 Medical-grade polyurethane, a polyurethane used in medicine; for example see Vas-occlusive contraception

Computing
 Memory protection unit, for example in the ARM Cortex-M
 Microprocessor unit, a central processing unit when referring to digital signal processors
 MPU-401 (MIDI Processing Unit), an obsolete standard for MIDI interfaces for personal computers
 Multi-core processing unit, a system made of two or more independent cores; See History of general-purpose CPUs

Other uses
 Mabua Airstrip (IATA code: MPU), an airport in Papua New Guinea
 Melbourne Poets Union, a forerunner of Australian Poetry and later reincarnated under the same name
 Minimum publishable unit, the smallest piece of a scientist's results that can be made into an academic paper
 Mișcarea Politică Unirea, a Moldovan political party
 Myanmar Payment Union, a Myanmar financial services corporation
 Medical-psychological assessment in Germany, called MPU for Medizinisch-Psychologische Untersuchung